Drill a Hole in That Substrate and Tell Me What You See is an album by Jim White, released in 2004. The co-vocals on "Static on the Radio" are by Aimee Mann.

The opening track of the album, "Static on the Radio," was used on the ending credits for El Camino: A Breaking Bad Movie.

Track listing
"Static on the Radio" – 6:31
"Bluebird" – 5:29
"Combing My Hair in a Brand New Style" – 6:24
"That Girl from Brownsville Texas" – 6:22
"Borrowed Wings" – 4:34
"If Jesus Drove a Motor Home" – 4:36
"Objects in Motion" – 5:58
"Buzzards of Love" – 7:00
"Alabama Chrome" – 4:25
"Phone Booth in Heaven" – 7:09
"Land Called Home" – 4:11

Personnel 
 Jim White - vocals, guitar, banjo, harmonica, melodica, trombone, piano, organ, keyboards, percussion
 David Palmer - keyboards, synthesizer, sampler
 Jay Bellerose - drums, bongos
 Ralph Carney - flute, saxophone, trumpet
 Steven Page - rap vocals, background vocals
 Jim Creeggan - percussion
 Steve Moore - trombone, Wurlitzer piano, harmonium, Wurlitzer organ
 Tyler Stewart - drums, percussion
 Ed Robertson - rap vocals, guitar
 Kevin Hearn - guitar, accordion, keyboards, synthesizer
 Danny Frankel - bongos, percussion
 Travis Good - guitar
 Eyvind Kang - viola, organ
 Mike Belitsky - drums
 Jeremiah Sullivan - mandolin
 Ryan Freeland - Clavinet
 Chris Henrich - pedal steel guitar
 David Piltch - double bass, electric bass, bass guitar
 Dorothy Robinett - bass clarinet
 Jon Hyde - pedal steel guitar, bass guitar
 Mark Saunders - sampler
 Paul Fonfara - viola, clarinet, saxophone
 Paul Rabjohns - acoustic guitar, mandolin, accordion, marimbula, bass guitar, snare drum, ron roco
 Tucker Martine - drums, percussion

Also 
 M. Ward
 Donna De Lory
 Niki Haris
 Chris Bruce
 Guthrie Trapp
 Dallas Good
 Linda Delgado
 Ladies Of Loretta Lynching
 Peter Gardiner
 Suzie Ungerleider
 Bill Frisell
 Aimee Mann
 Barenaked Ladies
 Mary Gauthier
 Joe Henry
 Marc Anthony Thompson
 Terri Binion
 Oh Susanna

References 

2004 albums
Jim White (musician) albums
Luaka Bop albums